Atli or variation, may refer to:

 Atli, an Old Norse given name
 Atlı, a Turkish surname
 Atli, another spelling for Attila
 Lay of Atli, a heroic poem of the Poetic Edda
 Greenlandic Poem of Atli, a heroic poem of the Poetic Edda
 Doğan Seyfi Atlı Stadium, Denizli, Turkey; a soccer stadium

See also

 
 Alti